Almagro, officially the Municipality of Almagro, is a 5th class municipality in the province of Samar, Philippines. According to the 2020 census, it has a population of 9,273 people.

Geography

Barangays
Almagro is politically subdivided into 23 barangays. 
 Bacjao
 Biasong I
 Costa Rica
 Guin-ansan
 Kerikite
 Lunang I (Look)
 Lunang II
 Malobago
 Marasbaras
 Panjobjoban I
 Poblacion
 Talahid
 Tonga-Tonga
 Imelda (Badjang)
 Biasong II
 Costa Rica II
 Mabuhay
 Magsaysay
 Panjobjoban II
 Roño
 San Isidro
 San Jose
 Veloso

Climate

Demographics

Economy

Tourism
 Pang-pang (Veloso and Panjobjoban 1)
 Exotic Diving Resort (Barangay Kerikite)
 Caves in Almagro
 Rock formation
 Museum of Endangered Species
 LightHouse (lighthouse island)

Culture

The most famous dance in Almagro is Kuratsa, because of the influence of the Spaniards that controlled the municipality for 330 years. They held their occasions on the newly constructed Covered Court in Barangay Poblacion. Their Fiestas and Charter Days are the days where many people would come to Almagro to witness different activities held on the island. People in Almagro are often seen wearing sando because of the hot weather and the sea breeze on the island.

Transportation
The only one means of access to Almagro is by motorboat from the port of Calbayog, taking usually up to 2 hours of travel.

References

External links
 Almagro Profile at PhilAtlas.com
 [ Philippine Standard Geographic Code]
 Philippine Census Information
 Local Governance Performance Management System

Municipalities of Samar (province)
Islands of Samar (province)
Island municipalities in the Philippines